Buciara is a genus of moths of the family Noctuidae.

Species
 Buciara bipartita Walker, 1869

References
 Buciara at Markku Savela's Lepidoptera and Some Other Life Forms
 Natural History Museum Lepidoptera genus database

Noctuinae